This is a list of scientific journals publishing articles in astronomy, astrophysics, and space sciences.

A

B
 Baltic Astronomy
 Bulletin of the American Astronomical Society
Bulgarian Astronomical Journal
 Bulletin of the Astronomical Society of India

C
 Celestial Mechanics and Dynamical Astronomy
 Classical and Quantum Gravity
 Connaissance des Temps
 Cosmic Research

E
 Earth and Planetary Science Letters
 Earth, Moon, and Planets
 Experimental Astronomy

G
 General Relativity and Gravitation
 Geophysical Research Letters

I
 Icarus
 International Astronomical Union Circular
 International Journal of Astrobiology

J

L
 Living Reviews in Solar Physics

M
 Meteoritics & Planetary Science
 Monthly Notices of the Royal Astronomical Society

N
 Nature Astronomy
 Nature Geoscience
 New Astronomy

O
 The Observatory
 Open Astronomy
 Open European Journal on Variable Stars (OEJV)

P
 Peremennye Zvezdy
 Pis’ma v Astronomicheskii Zhurnal
 Planetary and Space Science
 Publications of the Astronomical Society of Australia
 Publications of the Astronomical Society of Japan
 Publications of the Astronomical Society of the Pacific

R
 Research in Astronomy and Astrophysics
 Research Notes of the AAS
 Revista Mexicana de Astronomía y Astrofísica

S
 Serbian Astronomical Journal
 Solar Physics
 Solar System Research
 Space Science Reviews
 Sternenbote

 
Astronomy
Journals
 Journals